EcoHomes was an environmental rating scheme for homes in the United Kingdom. It was the domestic version of the Building Research Establishment's Environmental Assessment Method BREEAM, which could also be applied to a variety of non-residential buildings. It was replaced by the Code for Sustainable Homes in April 2008.

EcoHomes Assessments fall under one of four versions, Pre-2002, 2003, 2005 or the final 2006 version. It was not possible to compare homes built under one revision of the standard with homes built under another.

EcoHomes 2006
In particular, the 2006 version of EcoHomes increased the standards for energy efficiency, following the 2006 revisions energy efficiency requirements of the Building Regulations. It also incorporated a number of other changes.

Under the scheme, credits were first given for standards reached in the following areas:

Energy
Ene 1 - Dwelling Emission Rate
Ene 2 - Building fabric
Ene 3 - Drying space
Ene 4 - Ecolabelled goods
Ene 5 - Internal lighting
Ene 6 - External lighting
Transport
Tra 1 - Public transport
Tra 2 - Cycle storage
Tra 3 - Local amenities
Tra 4 - Home office
Pollution
Pol 1 - Insulant GWP
Pol 2 - NOx emissions
Pol 3 - Reduction of surface runoff
Pol 4 - Renewable and low emission energy source
Pol 5 - Flood risk
Materials
Mat 1 - Environmental impact of materials
Mat 2 - Responsible sourcing of materials: basic building elements
Mat 3 - Responsible sourcing of materials: finishing elements
Mat 4 - Recycling facilities
Water
Wat 1 - Internal potable water use
Wat 2 - External potable water use
Land Use and Ecology
Eco 1 - Ecological value of site
Eco 2 - Ecological enhancement
Eco 3 - Protection of ecological features
Eco 4 - Change of ecological value of site
Eco 5 - Building Footprint
Health and Wellbeing
Hea 1 - Daylighting
Hea 2 - Sound insulation
Hea 3 - Private space
Management
Man 1 - Home user guide
Man 2 - Considerate constructors
Man 3 - Construction site impacts
Man 4 - Security

A weighting system is then used to designate the home as Pass, Good, Very Good, or Excellent.

All homes funded by the Housing Corporation or by English Partnerships were required to meet the 2006 Very Good standard. Previously a Good designation sufficed. It was expected that this requirement would be replaced by compliance with the Government's Code for Sustainable Homes.

Criticisms
EcoHomes was criticised by some for getting the balance wrong between the various elements, and for valuing low embodied energy over the whole life performance of the building.

Early versions were criticised for allowing illogical trading-off between areas of the standards, so that, for example, homes with poor energy efficiency standards could still receive a high designation.

EcoHomes for refurbishment
EcoHomes could also be used for major refurbishments such as conversion projects and change of use and was specified for these types of projects, in the interim, whilst the BREEAM Domestic Refurbishment scheme was being developed. Since the start of the Domestic Refurbishment scheme, EcoHomes for Refurbishment registrations ended on 1 July 2012 and for transitional purposes, officially expired on 1 July 2014.  This applied to the whole of the UK, including Scotland.

See also
 Association for Environment Conscious Building
 Earthship Biotecture
 Energy efficiency in British housing
 Environmental design
 Geosolar
 Good Homes Alliance
 Green building
 Offgassing
 Sustainable development
 Sustainable design

Compare to-
LEED in the United States and Canada

References

External links
EcoHomes
Low carbon in Highlands 
Solar and Wind Energy Resources
Earthship Biotecture: Super EcoHomes, Completely Sustainable and Independent
The Home User Guide
Green Homes using Carbon Offsets
Carbon Reductive Eco Homes
Recent changes to BREEAM 2008 (video), A technical presentation on implications for the built environment
Vietnam Eco Homes
News
Spring 2006, Green Building Press, Discontent over the Code for Sustainable Development

Building energy rating
Energy conservation in the United Kingdom
Housing in the United Kingdom
Low-energy building in the United Kingdom
Science and technology in Hertfordshire
Sustainable building in the United Kingdom
Sustainable building rating systems